Badmaanyambuugiin Bat-Erdene is a Mongolian politician and athlete. Bat-Erdene is widely regarded in Mongolia as one of the most successful, long lasting and celebrated wrestlers, where he won in national non-jacketed wrestling formats as well as winning a gold medal in the Sambo jacket wrestling in the 1989 World Sambo Championships in the over 100kg heavyweight division. He was also Defense Minister of Mongolia from 2016 to July 2017.

Biography 
He was born on June 7, 1964 in Ömnödelger sum of Khentii aimag, Mongolia. He graduated from secondary school in 1982. He graduated from the Military Institute of the Mongolian People's Army in 1990 with a degree in law. He is married with 3 daughters. He speaks Russian and English.

Wrestling career
Between 1988-1999, Bat-Erdene won 11 national level tournaments in the Naadam. He was awarded with medals for his achievements including from the government. His rank/title in wrestling is "Dayar dursagdah, dalai dayan, tumniig bayasuulagch, darkhan avarga Bat-Erdene" literally meaning "Renowned by all, oceanic, makes people happy, strong titan Bat-Erdene" essentially the highest rank possible in Mongolian wrestling in Mongolia. He retired from wrestling in 2006.

Bat-Erdene established and owns Avarga (Champion) University which trains wrestlers, trainers and sportsmen in Ulaanbaatar.

Political career
Bat-Erdene has been a member of the State Great Khural from 2004 being elected three times from his native Khentii province on behalf of Mongolian People's Party. In 2009-2010 he worked as the chairman of the Legal Standing Committee of the State Great Khural. As a member of parliament, Bat-Erdene has been active in talking to protect nature and homeland against irresponsible mining.

Mongolian People's Party selected him as its candidate for 2013 Presidential election. Incumbent President Tsakhiagiin Elbegdorj, candidate of Democratic Party won at 2013 Mongolian presidential election on June 26, 2013 with 50.23% of total votes while Bat-Erdene got 41.97%, and Natsagiin Udval, candidate of Mongolian People's Revolutionary Party got 6.5% of total votes.

On 23 July 2016, 90.6 percent of the members of parliament voted in favor of appointing Bat-Erdene as the Minister of Defense.

Notes

External links
 

1964 births
Judoka at the 1988 Summer Olympics
Judoka at the 1992 Summer Olympics
Judoka at the 2000 Summer Olympics
Living people
Members of the State Great Khural
Mongolian People's Party politicians
Mongolian sportsperson-politicians
Mongolian male judoka
Mongolian male sport wrestlers
Olympic judoka of Mongolia
People from Khentii Province
Asian Games medalists in judo
Judoka at the 1990 Asian Games
Judoka at the 1994 Asian Games
Medalists at the 1990 Asian Games
Medalists at the 1994 Asian Games
Asian Games silver medalists for Mongolia
Asian Games bronze medalists for Mongolia
Ministers of Defence of Mongolia
Mongolian sambo practitioners
Sambo (martial art) practitioners
Mongolian wrestlers